Night Airs is the third album in a trilogy of piano albums by British rock musician Rick Wakeman. The first album in the trilogy is Country Airs, and the second is Sea Airs.

Track listing
"The Sad Dream" — 5:04
"Twilight" — 4:19
"The Sleeping Child" — 4:40
"Mr. Badger" — 4:45
"Jack Frost" — 3:50
"The Lone Star" — 4:14
"Rain Shadows" — 5:07
"Fox By Night" — 3:46
"Night Owls" — 4:39
"An Evening Romance" — 5:01

Trivia

By accident, a couple of the tracks on Sea Airs were destined for Night Airs and vice versa. However, they somehow ended up on the wrong CDs.
As the CDs had already been pressed and mastered the only solution was for Rick Wakeman to change the titles of the tracks involved at the last minute. However, he has never owned up to which tracks ended up on the wrong CDs.

Personnel
Rick Wakeman - piano, production

References

Rick Wakeman albums
New-age albums
1989 albums